Liptena durbania is a butterfly in the family Lycaenidae. It is found in Cameroon and the Republic of the Congo.

References

Butterflies described in 1915
Liptena